The College of Agricultural Engineering and Post Harvest Technology (CAEPHT), located in Ranipool, Gangtok (Sikkim), is one of the seven constituent colleges of the only Central Agricultural University (CAU) in India, funded by the Government of India through the Ministry of Agriculture, Department of Agriculture Research and Education (DARE). This college is considered among the top three colleges under the UGC-ICAR system. It imparts education, research and extension in the field of agricultural engineering. It aims to provide qualified technical human resource in agricultural and food process engineering to the public and industrial sector of northeast India through its undergraduate and postgraduate programmes.

Departments
CAEPHT has four departments:
Department of Process and Food Engineering
Department of Farm Machinery and Power
Department of Soil and Water Conservation Engineering
Department of Basic Sciences and Humanities

Academics

Undergraduate programmes
Every year students are admitted to two B. Tech. programmes, one in Agricultural Engineering and the other in Food Technology, on the basis of their performance and ranking in the Common Entrance Test conducted by North-Eastern states of India and ICAR. The undergraduate course in Agricultural Engineering includes subjects on basic sciences and engineering, computer science, and core engineering courses in farm machinery and power, soil and water conservation engineering, agricultural processing and food engineering, etc.

Similarly, the UG programme in Food Technology covers basic sciences and engineering, computer application and design, and core courses in food safety and quality control, plant design and layout, food product development, storage and packaging.

During the four years (spread over eight semesters) for the B. Tech programmes, a student reads a minimum of 168 credit hours and undergoes four months practical training in an industrial/training organisation. The students submit a project report in partial fulfillment of the programme.

Postgraduate programmes
The college has started M.Tech. in the following specializations in the academic session 2013-2014  :
Food Engineering 
Farm Power and Machinery Engineering
The college will start M.Tech. in  Soil and Water Engineering from the academic session 2014–2015.

Infrastructure
CAEPHT has its academic and administrative units in the Gangtok campus of CAU at Ranipool.

The college has an auditorium with a seating capacity of around 270. It has a centrally air-conditioned conference hall with audiovisual tools and a computer.

The college provides separate accommodation facilities (hostels) for boys and girls. All the rooms are equipped with Internet facilities. It has a training and placement unit to help students to decide on their training and career placement.

Library
CAEPHT Library has 8,500 volumes, including textbooks, reference books, encyclopaedias and non-book material such as CD-ROMs and audio tapes. It has access to the CAU central library with more than 100,000 books and subscription to more than 100 journals. The college library subscribes to about 100 periodicals. All operations of the library are automated with the help of an integrated library software package (LibSys). The database for the collection is available through Online Public Access Catalog (OPAC) to the users on the campus network.

It an has e-library facility for students with more than 100 computers in LAN with Internet access. CAEPHT Library, being a member of DELNET (Developing Library Network), provides online access to the Union Catalogue of Books, Union List of Current Periodicals, Database of Theses and Dissertations, MEDLINE and other databases of NLM, U.S. Patents: full text, and engineering and technology e-journals.

Laboratories
Laboratories include Physics and Chemistry for conducting practical in Basic Sciences, Engineering Drawing Laboratory, Electrical and Electronics Laboratory, Computer Laboratory, Thermo-Dynamics and Heat Engine Laboratory, Soil Mechanics and Fluid Mechanics Laboratory and Farm Machinery Laboratory etc. Farm Power, Surveying, Food Processing and Language Laboratories are being developed.

Pilot Plants
Many important pilot plants have been installed in the campus to train the students under experiential learning: Dairy Plant, Fruits and Vegetable Processing Plant, Rice Mill, Multistage Evaporator, Milk and Juice Powder Plant, Seed Processing Plant, Oil Expeller Plant etc.

Central Instrumentation Facility
The college has developed a central instrumentation facility which has many high-end instruments including super-critical fluid extraction, Texture analyzer, Color meter, GC, LC, GCMS, steam distillation and solvent extraction.

Computer Laboratory
The computer laboratory has 40 computers. Students have access to the computers for their courses. Computers are provided to the boys' and girls' hostels. Internet connectivity with 2 Mbit/s bandwidth has been developed in the college. The computer lab's software compilers include FORTRAN, Visual Studio, Adobe Suit, MS Office, PageMaker, etc. Facilities for CAD, CAM, Remote Sensing and GIS have been developed.

Important Links 
 College of Agricultural Engineering and Post Harvest Technology website
 Central Agricultural University website
 Indian Council of Agricultural Research website

Universities and colleges in Sikkim
Agricultural universities and colleges in India
Agriculture in Sikkim